The Scilly Isles Steam Navigation Company provided shipping services between Cornwall and the Isles of Scilly from 1858 to 1872.

Company

The company was founded in 1858 by John Banfield, Thomas Johns Buxton, William Mumford Hoskin and James Phillips, shareholders in the Little Western Steamship Association.

Vessels

The company operated two vessels.

SS Scotia

The steamship SS Scotia on loan for a few months in 1858 and 1859.

SS Little Western

The Little Western was launched at Renfrew from the yard of James Henderson and Son on 4 November 1858. She made her maiden voyage from Penzance to Scilly on 6 December 1858. She was a steam schooner with a two cylinder iron screw.  She displaced 115 ( 148 ) tons gross; 67 tons net and was 115ft 9ins in length; 18ft 5 ins in  breadth and 9ft 4ins in depth. On the winding up of the company in 1871, the ship was transferred to the West Cornwall Steam Ship Company.

She was wrecked on Southward Wells Reef, off Samson on 6 October 1872 while attempting to give assistance to a disabled brigantine ship, Due Fratelli.

See also
 West Cornwall Steam Ship Company
 Isles of Scilly Steamship Company

References

External links
 The Isles of Scilly/Penzance Mail Packets

1858 establishments in England
1872 disestablishments in England
Ferry companies of England
Water transport in Cornwall
Transport in the Isles of Scilly
Companies based in Cornwall
Ferry transport in England
Defunct ferry companies of the United Kingdom
British companies established in 1858
British companies disestablished in 1872
Transport companies established in 1858